Human Nature is a 2019 documentary film directed by Adam Bolt and written by Adam Bolt and Regina Sobel. Producers of the film include Greg Boustead, Elliot Kirschner and Dan Rather.

The film describes the gene editing process of CRISPR (an acronym for "Clustered Regularly Interspaced Short Palindromic Repeats"), and premiered in Austin, Texas at the South by Southwest film conference and festival on March 10, 2019.

Synopsis
Human Nature is a film documentary which presents an in-depth description of the gene editing process of CRISPR, and its possible implications. The film includes the perspective of the scientists who invented the process, and of the genetic engineers who are applying the process. The CRISPR process, a 2013 breakthrough in biology, provides a way of controlling the basic genetic processes of life.

In addition, the film documentary considers several relevant questions including, How will this new gene-editing ability change our relationship with nature? and, What will this new gene-editing ability mean for human evolution? The film, in beginning to answer such questions, presents a review of the distant past and takes an educated look into the future.

The film features the story of David Sanchez, a young man with sickle cell disease. He is first featured in the hospital, sharing his experience as he gets a red blood cell transfusion. This treatment is currently one of the only available for people with sickle cell to help manage severe pain crises. Geneticists Tshaka Cunningham, Ph.D. and Matt Porteus, M.D. discuss the prospect of using CRISPR to treat sickle cell disease at its genetic source. Porteus is set to start a clinical trial at Stanford University using CRISPR to treat sickle cell disease. At the end of the film, Sanchez speaks specifically about the role that sickle cell has had in shaping who he is today, stating “I don’t think I’d be me.”

Participants
The documentary film includes the following notable participants (alphabetized by last name):

 David Baltimore – American biologist
 Jill Banfield – American researcher
 Rodolphe Barrangou – American researcher
 Alta Charo – American bioethicist
 Emmanuelle Charpentier – French microbiologist
 George M. Church – American geneticist
 Tshaka Cunningham – American researcher
 George Q. Daley – American hematologist
 Jennifer Doudna – American biochemist
 Hank Greely – American lawyer
 Ian Hodder – British archaeologist
 Stephen Hsu – American physicist

 Francisco Mojica – Spanish microbiologist
 Ryan Phelan – Australian journalist

 Fyodor Urnov – Russian-born biomedical researcher
 Feng Zhang – American biochemist

Reviews and criticism
According to film reviewer Devindra Hardawar, writing in Engadget, the film is "a fascinating primer about what led to the discovery of the [CRISPR] tool, and an exploration of the role it may have in our society. It's hopeful about CRISPR's ability to help us fix diseases that have plagued humans for millennia, while also questioning if we're ready to make genetic changes that'll affect us for generations to come." Reviewer Danielle Solzman writes, "There’s a lot of science involved here.  I can't stop but grow cautious when it comes to the Jurassic Park [film] comparisons.  At the same time, I also want scientists to push for finding cures to cancer, MS, sickle cell anemia, etc.  Maybe gene editing is one possible solution as Human Nature shows." Film reviewer Sam Machkovech of Ars Technica asks, "[Does this film describe] the future of health? The future of a ... nightmare? By anchoring both of those extremes with a funny, human touch, Human Nature made me feel comfortable with a landing point somewhere closer to the middle." Reviewer Sean Boelman notes, "Overall, Human Nature [is] an interesting and effective documentary. If you are a fan of science-oriented films, this is not one you will want to miss."

See also

 Brief Answers to the Big Questions,2018 Stephen Hawking book
 Glossary of genetics
 Hachimoji DNA
 He Jiankui
 Lulu and Nana controversy
 Make People Better (2022 documentary)
 Synthetic biology
 Unnatural Selection (2019 TV documentary)

References

External links
 Official WebSite
 

2019 documentary films
2019 films
American documentary films
Films scored by Keegan DeWitt
Works about genetics
2010s English-language films
2010s American films